EELV may refer to:
 Evolved Expendable Launch Vehicle, the former name of the National Security Space Launch program
 Europe Ecology – The Greens, a political party in France